Millbourne/Woodvale stop is a tram stop under construction in the Edmonton Light Rail Transit network in Edmonton, Alberta, Canada. It will serve the Valley Line, and is located on the east side of 66 Street, north of 38 Avenue NW, at the corners of Michaels Park, Greenview, Hillview, and Lee Ridge. The stop was scheduled to open in 2020; however, as of December 2022 the  Valley Line had not opened and no definite opening date had been announced.

Around the station
Millbourne
Lee Ridge
Michaels Park
Millbourne Mall
Woodvale
Greenview
Hillview

References

External links
TransEd Valley Line LRT

Edmonton Light Rail Transit stations
Railway stations under construction in Canada
Valley Line (Edmonton)